Daylight is an independent daily online newspaper published in Lagos, Nigeria, by Mattuxx Media Limited The publisher/Editor-in-Chief of Daylight Newspaper, which was established in 2014, is Azuh Amatus (NGE), a multiple award-winning journalist. He is also the Chairman and Founder of Daylight Annual Leadership Awards (DALA), an award scheme that rewards and celebrates excellence in leadership positions.

References
  
 

Publications established in 2014
Newspapers published in Lagos
English-language newspapers published in Africa
2014 establishments in Nigeria
Daily newspapers published in Nigeria